The second and final series of the Irish talent competition series Ireland's Got Talent began broadcasting in Ireland on 2 February 2019 on Virgin Media One and was hosted by Lucy Kennedy.

Denise van Outen, Jason Byrne, Michelle Visage and Louis Walsh returned as judges for the second series.

The series was won by Dublin dance group BSD. They had received the golden buzzer from Jason Byrne. Dance group Fly Youth and gymnastics group Rebel Acro finished in the runner-up position.

Series overview
The judges auditions were taped in November 2018 at The Helix, Dublin.

Semi-finals summary

Semi-final 1 (30 March)

Guest performer: Mabel ("Don't Call Me Up")

Semi-final 2 (31 March)

Guest performer: Riverdance

Semi-final 3 (6 April)

Guest performer: Aslan

Final (7 April)

 Guest Performer: RDC (Series 1 winners) with Lyra, and Lewis Capaldi

References

Got Talent
2019 Irish television seasons